The Tea Party Community was a social networking and political networking website intended as an alternative to Facebook for use by American conservatives, founded by Ken Crow, Tim Selaty, Sr. and Tim Selaty, Jr. in November 2012 and launching on February 2, 2013.

History
In January 2013, Crow accused Facebook of intentionally targeting conservative members for censorship and described the new site as "a new home for conservatives and the Tea Party movement in America", which could help to facilitate "the organizational process" of the movement. The Tea Party Community is aesthetically similar to Facebook, which Crow described as intentional. As of February 1, 2013, it had drawn over 50,000 members. The site is now defunct.

References

Tea Party movement
American political websites
American social networking websites
Internet properties established in 2012
2012 establishments in the United States
Social networks for social change